Razdor is the name of several rural localities in Russia:
Razdor, Volodarsky District, Astrakhan Oblast, a village in Volodarsky District, Astrakhan Oblast
Razdor, Kamyzyaksky District, Astrakhan Oblast, a village in Kamyzyaksky District, Astrakhan Oblast